The 5G Automotive Association (5GAA) is a corporate coalition to develop and promote standardized protocols for automotive vehicles utilizing 5G communications.  It serves as a lobbying group for the European Union on behalf of its membership.  Their interests are government investments in the widespread deployment of short-range 5G wireless technology dubbed Cellular V2X.

History 
The 5GAA registered as a registered voluntary association in September 2016, by three German automotive manufacturers (AUDI AG, BMW Group, Daimler AG) and five major 5G patent holders (Ericsson, Huawei, Intel, Nokia and Qualcomm). In 2018, more than 80 companies have joined. Currently, more than 130 companies belong to the association.

In 2017, the 5GAA signed a letter of intent with the European Automotive Telecom Alliance (EATA) for collaboration.

Organization 
The 5GAA has a hierarchical membership structure based with the founding members at the top followed by the highest paying members.  A higher membership status provides the benefit of increased influence within the organization. The twelve core members, including the founding members, hold the exclusive right to nominate for the leadership positions and for general membership.

Work 
The 5GAA works for the standardization needed for the implementation of V2X communication in cooperation with standards organizations such as ETSI, 3GPP and SAE, focusing on cellular based communication known as Cellular V2X. V2X communications are primarily used for advanced driver-assistance systems but are hoped to be integrated into autonomous driving systems.

5GAA is opposed to usage of IEEE 802.11p and advocated against Delegated Act on Cooperative ITS, which endorsed Dedicated Short-Range Communications as the baseline communication technology.
  The Delegated Act was ultimately rejected by the EU Member States, due to the fact that 5.9 GHz ITS band must be technology neutral.

See also 
 Vehicle-to-everything
 5G NR frequency bands

References 

Emerging technologies
Vehicle technology
Vehicle telematics
Lobbying organizations in Europe